is a district of Minato, Tokyo, Japan. The current administrative place names are Konan 1-chome to Konan 5-chome. It is within the Shibaura-Kōnan District General Branch of the Japan Post Service.

Education
Minato City Board of Education operates public elementary and junior high schools.

Kōnan 1-5 chōme are zoned to Kōnan Elementary School (港南小学校) and Kōnan Junior High School (港南中学校).

References

External links

Districts of Minato, Tokyo